Selam is a village in the Champhai district of Mizoram, India.

Location
Selam is located in the Ngopa R.D. Block, within the Lengteng Wildlife Sanctuary.

Demographics 

According to the 2011 census of India, Selam has 209 households. The effective literacy rate (i.e. the literacy rate of population excluding children aged 6 and below) is 98.86%.

References 

Villages in Ngopa block